Les Auxons is a commune in the Doubs department in the Bourgogne-Franche-Comté region in eastern France. The result of the merger, on 1 January 2015, of the communes of Auxon-Dessous and Auxon-Dessus. Besançon Franche-Comté TGV station is situated in the commune.

Population

See also
 Communes of the Doubs department

References

Auxons